Jacques Fick (born 29 March 1994) is a South African rugby union player, who most recently played with the . His regular position is scrum-half.

Rugby career

He played rugby for the University of Johannesburg in 2013 and 2014, before moving to Durban, where he appeared for the s in the 2014 and 2015 Under-21 Provincial Championships, scoring one try in their 2014 match against the Blue Bulls. He also made three appearances for club side Durban Collegians in the 2015 SARU Community Cup.

He then moved to Cape Town, where he played club rugby for Durbanville-Bellville.

In August 2016, he was one of a number of club players drafted into a  team prior to their first match in the 2016 Currie Cup Premier Division.

References

South African rugby union players
Living people
1994 births
People from Springs, Gauteng
Rugby union scrum-halves
Eastern Province Elephants players
Rugby union players from Gauteng